Renntech is a Florida company established in 1989 by Hartmut Feyhl. It is best known for performance modifications of Mercedes-AMG automobiles.

Feyhl had spent 12 years at AMG before the tuning company became part of Mercedes-Benz in 1999, serving as that company's North American technical director and acting as a driving force behind the AMG Hammer—an iconic early 1990s automobile which was, for a time, the fastest production sedan on earth, with a top speed approaching 300 km/h.

Over the years, Feyhl and company have developed high-performance products for virtually all Mercedes-Benz AMG vehicles (including the commercial Mercedes-Benz Sprinter van). While most famous for Feyhl's powerful engines, pizza-sized brake kits, and sporting suspension know-how, Renntech is in fact a full-line aftermarket supplier that offers everything from shift knobs and steering wheels to complete cars - most notable among these are the 200 mph Renntech E7.4RS (which was called fastest sedan in the world by Car and Driver in 1996) and the 2006 "Chrome SL" showcar—an SL-based project entirely covered in chrome. 

Following the 1998 merger of Daimler-Benz and Chrysler Corp. (which became DaimlerChrysler later), Renntech began expanding into the Chrysler category, beginning with the Chrysler Crossfire, a car based heavily on Mercedes-Benz SLK components. It was logical move as Chryslers began to utilize more Mercedes-Benz parts, more of Renntech's components became compatible.

More recently, however, Renntech has begun to offer products for other marques as well - specifically product for Porsche, Volkswagen, and Audi vehicles. These product offerings, while less exhaustive than Renntech's Mercedes offerings, focus on Renntech's core competencies: engine tuning, braking, and suspension, with an emphasis on the higher-end Audis and Porsche SUVs.

Historically, Renntech has been a prominent Mercedes-Benz specialist, and Feyhl himself is regarded by many as the USA's foremost authority on Mercedes tuning. Renntech's high-performance cars are often featured on the covers of major automotive magazines, including Car and Driver , eMercedesBenz , Motor Trend , AutoWeek , Modified Luxury & Exotics and others. In a feature article on Ray Durham's Renntech modified SL55, Modified Luxury & Exotics refers to Renntech as one of the foremost Mercedes-Benz tuners in the world.

Renntech Karting
Renntech Karting is a division that makes racing karts, based on the Aixro XR50 rotary engines.

List of RENNtech vehicles
Mercedes-Benz
SLR McLaren
SLR McLaren 777 Concept
190E 3.6L W201 (1990)
C74 Konzept W204
SL600 R230
S550 W222
S550 W221
S600 W220
CL65 AMG W216
CL500 K W216
CLS55 AMG W219
E7.4RS W210
S700 Coupe C140
SLR7.4 R129
E63 AMG W211
CLK55 AMG W209
SLK32 AMG R170
SLK55 AMG R171
C38 W203
C43 AMG W202
C55 AMG W203
C63 AMG W204
G500 W463
GL 550 X164
GLK350 Hybrid Pikes Peak (2009)
ML 60 W163
ML 550 W164
Sprinter (2008) 
500E W124
Smart
smart fortwo (2009)
Maybach
Maybach 62
AIXRO
SLR.Kart

References

External links
Official website
Renntech Karting site

Auto parts suppliers of the United States
Companies based in Palm Beach County, Florida
Automotive motorsports and performance companies
Mercedes-Benz